Computed tomographic (CT) gastrography, also called virtual gastroscopy (VG), is a noninvasive procedure for the detection of gastric abnormalities. Multiple X-rays are used to create a 3-Dimensional image of the organ, allowing abnormalities to be detected.

Advantages 
 rapid and noninvasive 
 identifies local tumor invasion, lymph node and metastasis in cases of gastric cancer

Indications 
 early detection of gastric carcinoma
 to examine gastric abnormalities, e.g. hiatus hernia, polyps and ulcers
 post-surgical assessment of the stomach

Technique 
 Patient fasts at least 8 hours before the exam.
 Bowel distension, optimal gastric distention is a fundamental prerequisite for CT gastrography data evaluation; collapsed gastric wall may mimic disease or obscure underlying pathology.
 Negative oral contrast medium with effervescent granules is effective for optimal gastric distension.

Data acquisition and analysis 
 CT scanning is ideally performed on a multi-detector computed tomography (MDCT) with a thin collimation.
 Data interpretation with the use of two-dimensional (2D) and three-dimensional (3D) displays for proper evaluation

See also 
 CT examinations

References

Medical imaging